Erliansaurus (meaning "Erlian lizard") is a genus of therizinosaur theropod dinosaur that lived in Asia during the Cenomanian stage of the Late Cretaceous period in what is now Nei Mongol, Iren Dabasu Formation.

Discovery and naming
 
The remains of Erliansaurus were found near Sanhangobi in Inner Mongolia in 1999. The type species, Erliansaurus bellamanus, was described by Xu Xing, Zhang Xiaohong, Paul Sereno, Zhao Xijin, Kuang Xuewen, Han Jun and Tan Lin in 2002. The generic name refers to the town of Erlian and the specific name is derived from Latin bellus, "beautiful", and manus, "hand", in reference to the  exquisite preservation of the forelimb.

The holotype, LH V0002, was uncovered in the Iren Dabasu Formation dating from the Cenomanian stage. It consists of a partial skeleton belonging to a subadult individual. It includes two cervical, one dorsal and two caudal vertebrae; a right scapula; a left forelimb only lacking the carpus; a partial right ilium and a fragmented ischium and pubis; the right femur; both tibiae, a right fibula and partial metatarsals. No skull traces were found.

Description
 
The holotype specimen represents a not fully-grown individual based on one unfused caudal vertebra, and therefore its adult size may be larger than the contemporary Neimongosaurus.

Erliansaurus was a bipedal herbivore. For a therizinosauroid, its cervicals were rather short. The preserved femur was very straight and had a very rounded femoral head; it measures . Its fibula had an uncommon form, with a very high front edge and a concave top. The left arm is exceptionally preserved with almost every element intact, its hands bore enormous, strongly recurved and pointed claws of which the thumb claw was the largest, however, the carpal bones are missing.

Classification
Erliansaurus was by the describers assigned to the Therizinosauroidea, in a basal position and likely not a therizinosaurid. The cladistic analysis performed by the revision of Zanno in 2010 recovered it as a therizinosauroid. Some early cladistic analyses however, have recovered it as a basal member of the Therizinosauridae. The cladogram below is the result of the recently performed phylogenetic analysis of the Therizinosauridae by Hartman et al. 2019.

See also

 Timeline of therizinosaur research

References

Late Cretaceous dinosaurs of Asia
Fossil taxa described in 2002
Therizinosaurs
Taxa named by Xu Xing
Taxa named by Paul Sereno